The 1997 International Formula 3000 season was the thirty-first season of the second-tier of Formula One feeder championship and also thirteenth season under the International Formula 3000 Championship moniker. The championship was a ten-round series contested from 11 May to 25 October 1997. The Drivers' Championship was won by Brazilian Ricardo Zonta of Super Nova Racing, who won three races.

Drivers and teams 

The following teams and drivers contested the 1997 FIA Formula 3000 International Championship. The Lola T96/50 Zytek-Judd was used by all teams, as was mandatory under the championship regulations.

Calendar

Note:
 The Silverstone round was the Autosport International Trophy
 The Pau round was the 57th Grand Prix Automobile du Pau
 The Pergusa-Enna round was the 35th Gran Premio del Mediterraneo

Season summary
After finishing the season with two wins in the last three races of 1996, Brazil's Ricardo Zonta entered 1997 as the pre-season title favourite with the Super Nova team. However, he endured a frustrating start with no points from the first three races. The early pace in the championship battle was set by Denmark's Tom Kristensen, who inherited the race victory at a damp Silverstone from the disqualified Zonta, and then finished behind Juan Pablo Montoya on the street circuit at Pau. After an attritional race in Helsinki won by Soheil Ayari, where most of the major title contenders failed to finish and just nine drivers made it to the chequered flag, the field endured another wet race at the Nurburgring. It was marred by a serious accident involving British drivers Dino Morelli and Gareth Rees, in which Morelli suffered severe leg injuries which would keep him out of racing for the rest of the season. With the race abandoned after just four laps, Zonta was declared the winner, but with only half-points awarded.

By mid-season, the competitive start to the season left the championship battle wide open, with Kristensen and Enna winner Jamie Davies leading the standings halfway through the season ahead of Montoya, Zonta and Ayari. Zonta became the first driver to win twice with a dominant drive at Hockenheim, but left Germany a point behind the consistent Davies, who had been on the podium in four of the six races so far. However, at the A1-Ring, a disastrous qualifying left the British driver down in 24th place on the grid, leaving him out of contention for points. Montoya led home Zonta, who became the new championship leader.

The race at Spa-Francorchamps was another overshadowed by a large crash, as Kristensen crashed heavily while leading at the high-speed Blanchimont corner, triggering a pile-up, though no drivers were seriously injured. Denmark's Jason Watt took his first Formula 3000 race win to enter title contention, as Zonta could only manage to finish fifth, and his rivals all failed to score points. However, a month later, a controversial round at Mugello settled the championship - Kristensen was excluded from the event for running an illegal spacer, while Davies and DAMS team mate Gregoire de Galzain were also excluded for failure to attend the drivers' briefing. Zonta's race win, with Montoya only finishing third behind Watt, meant that the Brazilian was declared champion. The Auto Sport and Durango teams protested Zonta and Watt's results for allegedly having used illegal fuel and car parts, but this protest was quashed and the results stood. Montoya went on to win the final round at Jerez, securing second place in the championship. Watt finished third ahead of Davies, who had failed to score any points since taking the lead of the championship with four races to go.

None of the drivers who participated in the 1997 season were able to take seats on the 1998 Formula One grid. Zonta moved to the AMG Mercedes team in the FIA GT Championship, which he won jointly with Klaus Ludwig, and went on to drive for BAR in Formula One in 1999. Kristensen, who had won the 1997 24 Hours of Le Mans, moved into sportscar racing, while the remaining major contenders would return to Formula 3000 in 1998. Having won the 1996 Australian Touring Car Championship on debut, Craig Lowndes returned to Australia the following year and won a second ATCC title in as many attempts.

Drivers' Championship

Notes
All drivers used Lola T96/50 chassis, with Zytek-Judd engines, and Avon tyres.
Ricardo Zonta was disqualified from first place at Silverstone due to a gearbox irregularity.
 Nurburgring race was stopped prematurely due to an accident involving Dino Morelli in torrential rain. Half points awarded.
Juan Pablo Montoya was disqualified during the Spa-Francorchamps race for holding up the field with a damaged car.
Jamie Davies and Grégoire de Galzain were excluded from the race at Mugello for failing to attend the drivers' briefing.  Tom Kristensen was excluded from the same event due to having an illegal spacer fitted.
Rui Águas was disqualified during the race at Hockenheim for dangerous driving.
Cyrille Sauvage was disqualified from second place at Jerez because a member of his team entered parc fermé after the race.
Kurt Mollekens was excluded from the race at Silverstone after failing to attend the drivers' briefing.

Complete Overview

R24=retired, but classified R=retired NS=did not start NQ=did not qualify NT=no time set in qualifying DIS(1)=disqualified after finishing as winner (13)=place after practice, but grid position not held free DIS=disqualified in practice

References

External links
International F3000 1997 Retrieved from Unofficial F3000 Information on 15 March 2009
Images from the Spa round of the 1997 Formula 3000 International Championship Retrieved from www.jamd.com on 17 March 2009

International Formula 3000
International Formula 3000 seasons
Formula 3000